Thornton-Cleveleys is an unparished area in the Wyre district of Lancashire, England.  It contains eleven buildings that are recorded in the National Heritage List for England as designated listed buildings.  Of these, one is at Grade II*, the middle grade, and the others are at Grade II, the lowest grade.  The parish has an agricultural background, and is now largely residential.  The listed buildings consist of former farmhouses, other houses and cottages, a windmill, a war memorial, and two churches.


Key

Buildings

References

Citations

Sources

Lists of listed buildings in Lancashire
Buildings and structures in the Borough of Wyre